Saint Paul is an unincorporated community in Pickaway County, in the U.S. state of Ohio.

History
A post office was established at Saint Paul in 1861, and remained in operation until 1902. The reverend from the local St. Paul's Evangelical Lutheran Church was the first postmaster.

References

Unincorporated communities in Pickaway County, Ohio
Unincorporated communities in Ohio